Neobolusia is a genus of flowering plants from the orchid family, Orchidaceae. It contains 3 known species, all native to eastern and southern Africa.

Neobolusia ciliata Summerh. - Zimbabwe, Mozambique
Neobolusia stolzii Schltr. - Zimbabwe, Tanzania
Neobolusia tysonii (Bolus) Schltr. - Eswatini, Lesotho, South Africa

See also 
 List of Orchidaceae genera

References 

Pridgeon, A.M., Cribb, P.J., Chase, M.A. & Rasmussen, F. eds. (1999). Genera Orchidacearum 1. Oxford Univ. Press.
Pridgeon, A.M., Cribb, P.J., Chase, M.A. & Rasmussen, F. eds. (2001). Genera Orchidacearum 2. Oxford Univ. Press.
Pridgeon, A.M., Cribb, P.J., Chase, M.A. & Rasmussen, F. eds. (2003). Genera Orchidacearum 3. Oxford Univ. Press
Berg Pana, H. 2005. Handbuch der Orchideen-Namen. Dictionary of Orchid Names. Dizionario dei nomi delle orchidee. Ulmer, Stuttgart

Orchids of Africa
Orchideae genera
Orchideae